Jiří Novák and Andrei Pavel were the defending champions, but did not participate this year.

František Čermák and Pavel Vízner won in the final 7–5, 5–7, [10–7], against Marc Gicquel and Florent Serra.

Seeds

Draw

Draw

External links
Draw

Swiss Open (tennis)
Allianz Suisse Open Gstaad - Doubles
2007 Allianz Suisse Open Gstaad